Evie Wills (born 4 February 2001) is a Scottish rugby player from Stirling. She first played for the side in the 2021 Women's Six Nations Championship.

Club career 
Wills has played for Stirling County since she was seven, moving to the women's team in 2019, playing alongside her friend Evie Gallagher since a young age at the club. She plays as a stand-off/centre for the club.

International career 
In the 2021 Women's Six Nations Championship, she was the replacement in the match against Italy and gained her first cap coming off the bench at the match in Scotstoun in Glasgow. She was named as a substitute in Scotland's last match against Wales, which the Scottish team won 27-20. Coach Bryan Easson said of his decision to include Wills in the squad, "Evie Wills is a good distributor off left and right hand." In the weeks ahead of the match she was coached in her kicking by Scotland cap centurion Chris Paterson.

Wills first began playing rugby for Scotland, at 16 years old, when she played in the Scotland Seniors East v West tournament. She was selected to play in the Scotland U20s match against Northumbria; this was followed by an invitation to play in the U18s National 7s tournament in July.

In 2018 she played for the Scotland 7s, playing in the third leg of the Rugby Grand Prix in Kazan - the youngest in the squad by five years. Evie played against Russia and Portugal during the championships. Scotland came third in the tournament, losing to Russia and France.

She also played in the Scotland U18s 7s from 2018 and 2019.

Personal life 
Wills attended the Dollar Academy and started rugby at the age of seven through her local club Stirling County. She is studying to be a nurse at Glasgow Caledonian University.

References

External links 

 Women's Club Rugby Profile Page

2001 births
Living people
People educated at Dollar Academy
Rugby union players from Stirling
Scottish rugby union players
Rugby union fly-halves
Scotland women's international rugby union players